Klaudio Hyseni (born 15 July 1994) is an Albanian professional footballer who plays for Dinamo Tirana in the Albanian First Division.

Career

Early career
Hyseni is a graduate of the Sports mastery school Loro Boriçi, and played for the school's football team Shkëndija Tiranë as a teenager, where he was part of the team that won the 2012-13 national under-19s championship. Following an impressive season with the Shkëndija Tiranë U19s, where he scored 6 goals in 28 games and where he was also the club captain, he attracted the attention of Albanian Superliga clubs and eventually joined the Albanian champions Skënderbeu Korçë in the summer of 2013.

Skënderbeu
He was presented as a Skënderbeu Korçë player in July 2013 alongside Leonit Abazi. He joined the senior team for the 2013-14 campaign but found chances limited due to his age and lack of experience. He was an unused substitute in a 1–0 away win against Kastrioti Krujë on 27 October 2013. He made his senior competitive debut in the Albanian Cup against Iliria Fushë-Krujë on 6 November 2013 in an 8–0 win over the third-tier side. Hyseni started the game in midfield and played the entire 90 minutes of the game.

International career
Shortly after signing for Skënderbeu Korçë he was chosen to represent Albania at the 2013 Mediterranean Games in Mersin, Turkey. He played in 4 games in the tournament and scored in the final game against Italy in a 3–1 loss, which meant that Albania finished last in the tournament.

References

1994 births
Living people
Footballers from Tirana
Albanian footballers
Association football midfielders
Albania youth international footballers
Albania under-21 international footballers
KF Skënderbeu Korçë players
KF Teuta Durrës players
KF Erzeni players
Besa Kavajë players
KF Korabi Peshkopi players
KS Burreli players
KF Tërbuni Pukë players
Kategoria e Parë players
Kategoria Superiore players
Competitors at the 2013 Mediterranean Games
Mediterranean Games competitors for Albania